Fort Steilacoom Park in Lakewood, Washington is the largest park in the city. The  park includes Waughop Lake, an off-leash dog park, and several soccer fields and baseball fields. It is adjacent to Pierce College, historic Fort Steilacoom, and Western State Hospital.

The area became a homesteader's farm circa 1844, then became Fort Steilacoom in 1849. In 1868, the government purchased it for use as the "Insane Asylum for Washington Territory". Hospital residents grew crops and orchards in the park area, and planted many of the poplar trees that line the lake shore. More than 3,000 hospital residents are buried in the cemetery near the parking lot.

The park is the site of high school cross country meets in the fall and Pierce College utilizes it for athletic activities.  In September or October the Fort Steilacoom Invite is held, hosted by Lakes High School. It is currently the second largest meet in Washington state.

References

Lakewood, Washington
Parks in Washington (state)
Dog parks in the United States
Pierce College
Parks in Pierce County, Washington
Cross country running courses in Washington (state)